= Banniwala Mohra =

Mohra Banni
- Town
- Banniwala Mohra
- Location within Pakistan
- Coordinates: 33.23°N 73.20°E
- Country: Pakistan
- Province: (Islamabad Capital Territory) Islamabad C.T
- Elevation: 514 m (1,686 ft)
- Time zone: UTC+5 (PST)

Banniwala Mohra also known as Mohra Banni is a village in Punjab. It is situated to the southwest of Kallar Syedan. Kallar Syedan is a city located in Punjab, Pakistan, and is the headquarters of the Kallar Syedan Tehsil.

Banniwala Mohra is located at 33° 23' 55N 73° 20' 10E with an altitude of 514 metres (1689 feet).
